Caeneressa brithyris is a moth of the family Erebidae. It was described by Herbert Druce in 1898. It is found on Borneo and Sumatra.

References

Syntomini
Moths described in 1898